Dao Droste (born 1952) is a Vietnamese-born artist living in Germany.

She was born in Saigon and moved to Germany in 1971. Droste studied chemistry in Stuttgart and Heidelberg, earning a PhD. She went on to work in sculpture, painting and installation art. She established her own studio in 1987. She now lives in Eppelheim.

Her large installation piece "Open-mindedness", which included 500 terra cotta faces, attracted international attention.

As a Taoist, she explores the theme of mankind in harmony with nature in her art.

Droste designed the statue for the One World Award which is sponsored by Rapunzel Naturkost and the International Federation of Organic Agriculture Movements.

References

External links 
 

1952 births
Living people
Vietnamese women artists
21st-century Vietnamese painters
Vietnamese sculptors
Vietnamese contemporary artists
German women painters
German women sculptors
German installation artists
21st-century German women artists
People from Ho Chi Minh City
21st-century Vietnamese women